The 2005–06 Miami Heat season was the 18th National Basketball Association season for the Miami Heat basketball franchise. During the offseason, the Heat acquired Jason Williams and James Posey from the Memphis Grizzlies, and All-Star forward Antoine Walker from the Boston Celtics, while signing free agent All-Star point guard Gary Payton. Early into the season, after a 15–12 start to the year, head coach Stan Van Gundy resigned, citing the desire to spend more time with his family, and Pat Riley resumed coaching the Heat. The Heat went 39–23 the rest of the way, finishing with a 52–30 record, good enough for first place in the Southeast Division and second place in the Eastern Conference overall. Dwyane Wade and Shaquille O'Neal were both selected for the 2006 NBA All-Star Game.

In the first round of the playoffs, the Heat defeated the Chicago Bulls in six games, and the New Jersey Nets in five games in the semi-finals to advance to the Eastern Conference Finals against the Detroit Pistons in a rematch of last year's playoffs. After splitting the first two games of the series, the Heat defeated the Pistons in six games to advance to the NBA Finals for the first time in franchise history, where they faced the Dallas Mavericks. After losing the first two games of the series, the Heat recovered to win the next four games and the first ever championship in franchise history.  The team was nicknamed "15 Strong".

Offseason
 In August 2005, Shaquille O'Neal signed a 5-year-extension with the Heat for $100 million. Supporters applauded O'Neal's willingness to take what amounted to a pay cut, and the Heat's decision to secure O'Neal's services for the long term. They contend that O'Neal was worth more than $20 million per year, particularly given that considerably less valuable players earn almost the same amount. Critics, however, questioned the wisdom of the move, characterizing it as overpaying an aging and often injured player.
 On August 2, 2005, the Heat were involved in one of the largest trades in NBA history. It was a five-team trade which included the Heat, the New Orleans Hornets, the Memphis Grizzlies, the Boston Celtics, and the Utah Jazz. The Heat traded Rasual Butler to the Hornets, Eddie Jones to the Grizzlies, and Albert Miralles, Qyntel Woods, a 2006 2nd round draft pick, and a 2008 2nd round draft pick to the Celtics. In return, the Heat received Antoine Walker from the Celtics, Andre Emmett, James Posey, and Jason Williams from the Grizzlies, and Roberto Dueñas from the Hornets. Walker would be a reliable bench player during the season. Posey and Williams would be starters at small forward and point guard, respectively. Emmett would be waived on October 31, while Dueñas would not sign with the team.

On the same day, the Heat would sign Kasib Powell. He would sign with the Chicago Bulls on September 29, and the Bulls waived him on November 2. Powell may not have played on the Heat during the season, but would join the team two seasons later.
 On August 12, the Heat signed Gerald Fitch. Fitch would be traded to the Houston Rockets on February 23 for Derek Anderson.
 On August 15, the Heat signed Matt Walsh. Walsh would be waived on November 18.
 On September 22, the Heat signed Hall-of-Famer Gary Payton. Payton would play his final two seasons in the NBA with the Heat.
 On October 3, the Heat signed Jason Kapono.
 On October 8, the Heat signed Earl Barron.

NBA draft

Roster

Regular season
 In the second game of the 2005–06 season, O'Neal injured his right ankle and subsequently missed the following 18 games. Many critics stated that Heat coach Pat Riley correctly managed O'Neal during the rest of the season, limiting his minutes to a career low. Riley felt doing so would allow O'Neal to be healthier and fresher come playoff time. Although O'Neal averaged career (or near-career) lows in points, rebounds, and blocks, he said in an interview "Stats don't matter. I care about winning, not stats. If I score 0 points and we win I'm happy. If I score 50, 60 points, break the records, and we lose, I'm pissed off. 'Cause I knew I did something wrong. I'll have a hell of a season if I win the championship and average 20 points a game." During the 2005–06 season, the Heat recorded only a .500 record without O'Neal in the line-up.
 During the 2005 off-season, it was widely speculated Pat Riley was attempting to run Van Gundy out of his coaching job and take over the job himself, as the team was in a position to contend for the championship. Van Gundy would resign from his position as head coach on December 12, 2005, just 21 games into the season, citing a need to spend more time with his family. Riley replaced him as head coach, and led Miami to their first championship that same season.

In Shaquille O'Neal's book, "Shaq Uncut: My Story", O'Neal responded to allegations of being a "coach killer" and that he forced Van Gundy out of Miami by stating: "Stan got fired because Pat (Riley) wanted to take over, not because I wanted him out. I had no control over it — not a smidgen of control. We all kind of knew it was coming because Pat and Stan were always arguing. Pat would come down and tell Stan how to do something and Stan would want to do it his own way, and that was a fine game plan if you wanted to get yourself fired."
 On April 11, 2006, Shaquille O'Neal recorded his second career triple-double against the Toronto Raptors with 15 points, 11 rebounds and a career high 10 assists.

Standings

Record vs. opponents

Game log

|- bgcolor="#ccffcc"
| 1
| November 2
| @ Memphis
| 
| Antoine Walker (25)
| Antoine Walker (16)
| Dwyane Wade (6)
| FedEx Forum
| 1-0
|- bgcolor="#ffcccc"
| 2
| November 3
| Indiana
| 
| Dwyane Wade (31)
| Udonis Haslem (8)
| Dwyane Wade (10)
| American Airlines Arena
| 1-1
|- bgcolor="#ffcccc"
| 3
| November 5
| @ Milwaukee
| 
| Dwyane Wade (21)
| Alonzo Mourning (12)
| Dwyane Wade (9)
| Bradley Center
| 1-2
|- bgcolor="#ccffcc"
| 4
| November 7
| New Jersey
| 
| Dwyane Wade (23)
| Alonzo Mourning (11)
| Dwyane Wade (6)
| American Airlines Arena
| 2-2
|- bgcolor="#ffcccc"
| 5
| November 9
| @ Indiana
| 
| Dwyane Wade (29)
| Dwyane Wade, Udonis Haslem (11)
| Dwyane Wade (6)
| Conseco Fieldhouse
| 2-3
|- bgcolor="#ccffcc"
| 6
| November 10
| Houston
| 
| Dwyane Wade (25)
| Alonzo Mourning (9)
| Dwyane Wade (7)
| American Airlines Arena
| 3-3
|- bgcolor="#ccffcc"
| 7
| November 12
| Charlotte
| 
| Jason Williams (22)
| Udonis Haslem (11)
| Jason Williams, Dwyane Wade (7)
| American Airlines Arena
| 4-3
|- bgcolor="#ccffcc"
| 8
| November 15
| New Orleans/Oklahoma City
| 
| Dwyane Wade (25)
| Alonzo Mourning (11)
| Dwyane Wade (10)
| American Airlines Arena
| 5-3
|- bgcolor="#ccffcc"
| 9
| November 18
| Philadelphia
| 
| Dwyane Wade (32)
| Udonis Haslem (12)
| Dwyane Wade (10)
| American Airlines Arena
| 6-3
|- bgcolor="#ffcccc"
| 10
| November 20
| @ Toronto
| 
| Dwyane Wade (33)
| Dwyane Wade (8)
| Dwyane Wade (9)
| Air Canada Centre
| 6-4
|- bgcolor="#ccffcc"
| 11
| November 23
| Portland
| 
| Dwyane Wade (19)
| Dwyane Wade (11)
| Dwyane Wade, Jason Williams, Antoine Walker (4)
| American Airlines Arena
| 7-4
|- bgcolor="#ffcccc"
| 12
| November 25
| Dallas
| 
| Jason Williams (24)
| Udonis Haslem (8)
| Jason Williams (5)
| American Airlines Arena
| 7-5
|- bgcolor="#ffcccc"
| 13
| November 26
| @ Orlando
| 
| Dwyane Wade (21)
| Alonzo Mourning (21)
| Dwyane Wade (4)
| TD Waterhouse Centre
| 7-6
|- bgcolor="#ccffcc"
| 14
| November 28
| New York
| 
| Dwyane Wade (33)
| Udonis Haslem (12)
| Jason Williams (6)
| American Airlines Arena
| 8-6
|- bgcolor="#ccffcc"
| 15
| November 30
| @ Atlanta
| 
| Jason Williams (21)
| Alonzo Mourning (12)
| Jason Williams (9)
| Philips Arena
| 9-6

|- bgcolor="#ccffcc"
| 16
| December 2
| @ Sacramento
| 
| Dwyane Wade (27)
| Udonis Haslem (8)
| Jason Williams (8)
| ARCO Arena
| 10-6
|- bgcolor="#ffcccc"
| 17
| December 3
| @ Denver
| 
| Dwyane Wade (32)
| James Posey (10)
| Dwyane Wade (6)
| Pepsi Center
| 10-7
|- bgcolor="#ffcccc"
| 18
| December 5
| @ L.A. Clippers
| 
| Dwyane Wade (29)
| Alonzo Mourning (12)
| Jason Williams (9)
| Staples Center
| 10-8
|- bgcolor="#ffcccc"
| 19
| December 7
| @ San Antonio
| 
| Dwyane Wade (31)
| Alonzo Mourning (7)
| Dwyane Wade (10)
| SBC Center
| 10-9
|- bgcolor="#ffcccc"
| 20
| December 9
| Denver
| 
| Dwyane Wade (37)
| Dwyane Wade (10)
| Antoine Walker (5)
| American Airlines Arena
| 10-10
|- bgcolor="#ccffcc"
| 21
| December 11
| Washington
| 
| Dwyane Wade (41)
| Shaquille O'Neal (11)
| Dwyane Wade (8)
| American Airlines Arena
| 11-10
|- bgcolor="#ccffcc"
| 22
| December 13
| @ Chicago
| 
| Shaquille O'Neal (30)
| Alonzo Mourning (12)
| Dwyane Wade (11)
| United Center
| 12-10
|- bgcolor="#ccffcc"
| 23
| December 14
| @ Milwaukee
| 
| Dwyane Wade (27)
| Udonis Haslem (10)
| Dwyane Wade (7)
| Bradley Center
| 13-10
|- bgcolor="#ccffcc"
| 24
| December 16
| @ Philadelphia
| 
| Dwyane Wade (32)
| Shaquille O'Neal (13)
| Gary Payton (5)
| Wachovia Center
| 14-10
|- bgcolor="#ffcccc"
| 25
| December 17
| @ Cleveland
| 
| Dwyane Wade (33)
| Shaquille O'Neal (6)
| Dwyane Wade, Antoine Walker (7)
| Quicken Loans Arena
| 14-11
|- bgcolor="#ccffcc"
| 26
| December 20
| Atlanta
| 
| Shaquille O'Neal (28)
| Shaquille O'Neal (10)
| Gary Payton (8)
| American Airlines Arena
| 15-11
|- bgcolor="#ffcccc"
| 27
| December 23
| New Jersey
| 
| Shaquille O'Neal (24)
| Shaquille O'Neal (14)
| Dwyane Wade (7)
| American Airlines Arena
| 15-12
|- bgcolor="#ccffcc"
| 28
| December 25
| L.A. Lakers
| 
| Gary Payton (21)
| Shaquille O'Neal (17)
| Dwyane Wade (5)
| American Airlines Arena
| 16-12
|- bgcolor="#ccffcc"
| 29
| December 27
| Milwaukee
| 
| Dwyane Wade (35)
| Shaquille O'Neal (8)
| Dwyane Wade, Jason Williams (7)
| American Airlines Arena
| 17-12
|- bgcolor="#ffcccc"
| 30
| December 29
| @ Detroit
| 
| Dwyane Wade (33)
| Udonis Haslem (10)
| Dwyane Wade (9)
| The Palace of Auburn Hills
| 17-13
|- bgcolor="#ccffcc"
| 31
| December 30
| @ Washington
| 
| Dwyane Wade (34)
| Antoine Walker (13)
| Gary Payton (7)
| MCI Center
| 18-13

|- bgcolor="#ccffcc"
| 32
| January 1
| Minnesota
| 
| Dwyane Wade (19)
| Alonzo Mourning (10)
| Dwyane Wade (9)
| American Airlines Arena
| 19-13
|- bgcolor="#ffcccc"
| 33
| January 4
| @ New Orleans/Oklahoma City
| 
| Shaquille O'Neal, Dwyane Wade (19)
| Dwyane Wade (10)
| Dwyane Wade (10)
| Ford Center
| 19-14
|- bgcolor="#ffcccc"
| 34
| January 6
| @ Phoenix
| 
| Antoine Walker (22)
| Shaquille O'Neal (13)
| Gerald Fitch (6)
| America West Arena
| 19-15
|- bgcolor="#ccffcc"
| 35
| January 8
| @ Portland
| 
| Dwyane Wade (31)
| James Posey (9)
| Jason Williams (8)
| Rose Garden
| 20-15
|- bgcolor="#ccffcc"
| 36
| January 11
| @ Golden State
| 
| Dwyane Wade (32)
| Udonis Haslem, Shaquille O'Neal (10)
| Dwyane Wade (11)
| The Arena in Oakland
| 21-15
|- bgcolor="#ccffcc"
| 37
| January 13
| @ Seattle
| 
| James Posey, Jason Williams (19)
| Dwyane Wade (10)
| Dwyane Wade (14)
| KeyArena
| 22-15
|- bgcolor="#ccffcc"
| 38
| January 14
| @ Utah
| 
| Dwyane Wade (31)
| Shaquille O'Neal (14)
| Dwyane Wade (8)
| Delta Center
| 23-15
|- bgcolor="#ffcccc"
| 39
| January 16
| @ L.A. Lakers
| 
| Dwyane Wade (34)
| Udonis Haslem (12)
| Dwyane Wade (7)
| Staples Center
| 23-16
|- bgcolor="#ffcccc"
| 40
| January 20
| San Antonio
| 
| Dwyane Wade (36)
| James Posey, Antoine Walker (7)
| Udonis Haslem, Jason Williams (3)
| American Airlines Arena
| 23-17
|- bgcolor="#ccffcc"
| 41
| January 22
| Sacramento
| 
| Shaquille O'Neal (27)
| Dwyane Wade, Udonis Haslem, Shaquille O'Neal (6)
| Jason Williams (11)
| American Airlines Arena
| 24-17
|- bgcolor="#ccffcc"
| 42
| January 24
| Memphis
| 
| Dwyane Wade (25)
| Shaquille O'Neal (15)
| Jason Williams (6)
| American Airlines Arena
| 25-17
|- bgcolor="#ffcccc"
| 43
| January 26
| Phoenix
| 
| Dwyane Wade (25)
| Shaquille O'Neal (12)
| Gary Payton (8)
| American Airlines Arena
| 25-18
|- bgcolor="#ccffcc"
| 44
| January 27
| @ Charlotte
| 
| Shaquille O'Neal (23)
| Gerald Fitch (8)
| Gary Payton (8)
| Charlotte Arena
| 26-18
|- bgcolor="#ccffcc"
| 45
| January 29
| @ Houston
| 
| Dwyane Wade (32)
| Shaquille O'Neal (14)
| Dwyane Wade (9)
| Toyota Center
| 27-18
|- bgcolor="#ccffcc"
| 46
| January 30
| L.A. Clippers
| 
| Dwyane Wade (28)
| Shaquille O'Neal (8)
| Dwyane Wade (11)
| American Airlines Arena
| 28-18

|- bgcolor="#ccffcc"
| 47
| February 2
| Cleveland
| 
| Dwyane Wade (24)
| James Posey (10)
| Jason Williams (8)
| American Airlines Arena
| 29-18
|- bgcolor="#ffcccc"
| 48
| February 4
| @ New Jersey
| 
| Dwyane Wade (31)
| James Posey, Shaquille O'Neal (7)
| Jason Williams (7)
| Continental Airlines Arena
| 29-19
|- bgcolor="#ccffcc"
| 49
| February 6
| Boston
| 
| Dwyane Wade (34)
| Dwyane Wade (8)
| Dwyane Wade (8)
| American Airlines Arena
| 30-19
|- bgcolor="#ffcccc"
| 50
| February 9
| @ Dallas
| 
| Shaquille O'Neal (23)
| Shaquille O'Neal (8)
| Dwyane Wade (8)
| American Airlines Center
| 30-20
|- bgcolor="#ccffcc"
| 51
| February 12
| Detroit
| 
| Dwyane Wade (37)
| Dwyane Wade, Shaquille O'Neal (8)
| Jason Williams (5)
| American Airlines Arena
| 31-20
|- bgcolor="#ccffcc"
| 52
| February 14
| Orlando
| 
| Dwyane Wade (38)
| Udonis Haslem (14)
| Jason Williams (4)
| American Airlines Arena
| 32-20
|- bgcolor="#ccffcc"
| 53
| February 15
| @ Orlando
| 
| Dwyane Wade (36)
| Udonis Haslem (12)
| Dwyane Wade (9)
| TD Waterhouse Centre
| 33-20
|- bgcolor="#ccffcc"
| 54
| February 22
| @ New York
| 
| Jason Williams, Dwyane Wade (24)
| Udonis Haslem (8)
| Jason Williams, Dwyane Wade (5)
| Madison Square Garden
| 34-20
|- bgcolor="#ccffcc"
| 55
| February 25
| Seattle
| 
| Shaquille O'Neal (31)
| Antoine Walker, Shaquille O'Neal (9)
| Dwyane Wade (11)
| American Airlines Arena
| 35-20
|- bgcolor="#ccffcc"
| 56
| February 27
| Toronto
| 
| Dwyane Wade (32)
| Shaquille O'Neal (11)
| Dwyane Wade (6)
| American Airlines Arena
| 36-20

|- bgcolor="#ccffcc"
| 57
| March 1
| @ Boston
| 
| Dwyane Wade (24)
| Shaquille O'Neal (9)
| Jason Williams (9)
| FleetCenter
| 37-20
|- bgcolor="#ccffcc"
| 58
| March 4
| Atlanta
| 
| Shaquille O'Neal (21)
| Shaquille O'Neal (8)
| Jason Williams (7)
| American Airlines Arena
| 38-20
|- bgcolor="#ccffcc"
| 59
| March 6
| @ Charlotte
| 
| Shaquille O'Neal (35)
| Udonis Haslem (13)
| Jason Williams (5)
| Charlotte Arena
| 39-20
|- bgcolor="#ccffcc"
| 60
| March 8
| Washington
| 
| Dwyane Wade (40)
| Shaquille O'Neal (11)
| Dwyane Wade, Jason Williams (5)
| American Airlines Arena
| 40-20
|- bgcolor="#ffcccc"
| 61
| March 10
| Golden State
| 
| Dwyane Wade (42)
| Shaquille O'Neal (15)
| Dwyane Wade (6)
| American Airlines Arena
| 40-21
|- bgcolor="#ccffcc"
| 62
| March 12
| Cleveland
| 
| Dwyane Wade (35)
| Dwyane Wade (9)
| Dwyane Wade (7)
| American Airlines Arena
| 41-21
|- bgcolor="#ccffcc"
| 63
| March 14
| Atlanta
| 
| Dwyane Wade (25)
| Alonzo Mourning, Udonis Haslem, Shaquille O'Neal (7)
| Jason Williams (7)
| American Airlines Arena
| 42-21
|- bgcolor="#ccffcc"
| 64
| March 16
| Boston
| 
| Dwyane Wade (30)
| Udonis Haslem, Shaquille O'Neal (11)
| Dwyane Wade (6)
| American Airlines Arena
| 43-21
|- bgcolor="#ccffcc"
| 65
| March 18
| @ Chicago
| 
| Dwyane Wade (15)
| Udonis Haslem (11)
| Jason Williams (5)
| United Center
| 44-21
|- bgcolor="#ccffcc"
| 66
| March 19
| @ New York
| 
| Dwyane Wade (30)
| Udonis Haslem (7)
| Dwyane Wade, Jason Williams (9)
| Madison Square Garden
| 45-21
|- bgcolor="#ffcccc"
| 67
| March 21
| @ Minnesota
| 
| Dwyane Wade (35)
| Alonzo Mourning (12)
| Dwyane Wade (8)
| American Airlines Arena
| 45-22
|- bgcolor="#ffcccc"
| 68
| March 22
| @ Detroit
| 
| Shaquille O'Neal (27)
| Udonis Haslem (12)
| Dwyane Wade (9)
| The Palace of Auburn Hills
| 45-23
|- bgcolor="#ccffcc"
| 69
| March 24
| Charlotte
| 
| Dwyane Wade (24)
| Shaquille O'Neal (9)
| Dwyane Wade (8)
| American Airlines Arena
| 46-23
|- bgcolor="#ccffcc"
| 70
| March 27
| Indiana
| 
| Shaquille O'Neal (23)
| Shaquille O'Neal (11)
| Dwyane Wade (5)
| American Airlines Arena
| 47-23
|- bgcolor="#ccffcc"
| 71
| March 29
| @ Toronto
| 
| Dwyane Wade (37)
| Antoine Walker (10)
| Shandon Anderson (4)
| Air Canada Centre
| 48-23

|- bgcolor="#ffcccc"
| 72
| April 1
| @ Cleveland
| 
| Dwyane Wade (44)
| Udonis Haslem (11)
| Dwyane Wade (9)
| Gund Arena
| 48-24
|- bgcolor="#ffcccc"
| 73
| April 2
| @ New Jersey
| 
| Dwyane Wade (32)
| Udonis Haslem (11)
| Gary Payton (7)
| Continental Airlines Arena
| 48-25
|- bgcolor="#ccffcc"
| 74
| April 4
| Milwaukee
| 
| Shaquille O'Neal (24)
| Shaquille O'Neal (10)
| Dwyane Wade (8)
| American Airlines Arena
| 49-25
|- bgcolor="#ffcccc"
| 75
| April 6
| Detroit
| 
| Dwyane Wade (29)
| Dwyane Wade (9)
| Dwyane Wade (6)
| American Airlines Arena
| 49-26
|- bgcolor="#ccffcc"
| 76
| April 8
| @ Washington
| 
| Shaquille O'Neal (27)
| Udonis Haslem (14)
| Gary Payton, Dwyane Wade (8)
| MCI Center
| 50-26
|- bgcolor="#ffcccc"
| 77
| April 9
| Orlando
| 
| Dwyane Wade (27)
| Shaquille O'Neal (9)
| Dwyane Wade (7)
| American Airlines Arena
| 50-27
|- bgcolor="#ccffcc"
| 78
| April 11
| Toronto
| 
| Antoine Walker (32)
| Shaquille O'Neal (11)
| Shaquille O'Neal (10)
| American Airlines Arena
| 51-27
|- bgcolor="#ccffcc"
| 79
| April 14
| Philadelphia
| 
| Udonis Haslem (24)
| Udonis Haslem (14)
| Dwyane Wade (8)
| American Airlines Arena
| 52-27
|- bgcolor="#ffcccc"
| 80
| April 16
| Chicago
| 
| Antoine Walker (22)
| Shaquille O'Neal (6)
| Derek Anderson, Jason Williams (3)
| American Airlines Arena
| 52-28
|- bgcolor="#ffcccc"
| 81
| April 18
| @ Atlanta
| 
| Dorell Wright (19)
| Dorell Wright (7)
| Jason Kapono (6)
| Philips Arena
| 52-29
|- bgcolor="#ffcccc"
| 82
| April 19
| @ Boston
| 
| Dorell Wright (20)
| Udonis Haslem (8)
| Derek Anderson (4)
| TD Garden
| 52-30

Player stats

Regular season 

* Statistics include only games with the Heat

Playoffs 

* Statistics include only games with the Heat

Playoffs

|- align="center" bgcolor="#ccffcc"
| 1
| April 22
| Chicago
| W 111–106
| Dwyane Wade (30)
| Shaquille O'Neal (16)
| Dwyane Wade (11)
| American Airlines Arena20,288
| 1–0
|- align="center" bgcolor="#ccffcc"
| 2
| April 24
| Chicago
| W 115–108
| Williams, O'Neal (22)
| Antoine Walker (10)
| Dwyane Wade (7)
| American Airlines Arena20,214
| 2–0
|- align="center" bgcolor="#ffcccc"
| 3
| April 27
| @ Chicago
| L 90–109
| Dwyane Wade (26)
| Udonis Haslem (10)
| Wade, Williams (4)
| United Center22,133
| 2–1
|- align="center" bgcolor="#ffcccc"
| 4
| April 30
| @ Chicago
| L 87–93
| Antoine Walker (21)
| Udonis Haslem (9)
| Dwyane Wade (10)
| United Center22,361
| 2–2
|- align="center" bgcolor="#ccffcc"
| 5
| May 2
| Chicago
| W 92–78
| Dwyane Wade (28)
| Shaquille O'Neal (10)
| Dwyane Wade (5)
| American Airlines Arena20,287
| 3–2
|- align="center" bgcolor="#ccffcc"
| 6
| May 4
| @ Chicago
| W 113–96
| Shaquille O'Neal (30)
| Shaquille O'Neal (20)
| Dwyane Wade (6)
| United Center22,584
| 4–2

|- align="center" bgcolor="#ffcccc"
| 1
| May 8
| New Jersey
| L 88–100
| Dwyane Wade (25)
| Shaquille O'Neal (10)
| Wade, Williams (3)
| American Airlines Arena20,208
| 0–1
|- align="center" bgcolor="#ccffcc"
| 2
| May 10
| New Jersey
| W 111–89
| Dwyane Wade (31)
| Udonis Haslem (10)
| Dwyane Wade (6)
| American Airlines Arena20,227
| 1–1
|- align="center" bgcolor="#ccffcc"
| 3
| May 12
| @ New Jersey
| W 103–92
| Dwyane Wade (30)
| James Posey (10)
| Dwyane Wade (10)
| Continental Airlines Arena20,102
| 2–1
|- align="center" bgcolor="#ccffcc"
| 4
| May 14
| @ New Jersey
| W 102–92
| Dwyane Wade (31)
| Udonis Haslem (11)
| Dwyane Wade (8)
| Continental Airlines Arena19,474
| 3–1
|- align="center" bgcolor="#ccffcc"
| 5
| May 16
| New Jersey
| W 106–105
| Antoine Walker (23)
| Udonis Haslem (10)
| Dwyane Wade (6)
| American Airlines Arena20,255
| 4–1

|- align="center" bgcolor="#ccffcc"
| 1
| May 23
| @ Detroit
| W 91–86
| Dwyane Wade (25)
| Udonis Haslem (9)
| Dwyane Wade (5)
| The Palace of Auburn Hills22,076
| 1–0
|- align="center" bgcolor="#ffcccc"
| 2
| May 25
| @ Detroit
| L 88–92
| Dwyane Wade  (32)
| Shaquille O'Neal (17)
| Dwyane Wade  (5)
| The Palace of Auburn Hills22,076
| 1–1
|- align="center" bgcolor="#ccffcc"
| 3
| May 27
| Detroit
| W 98–83
| Dwyane Wade (35)
| Shaquille O'Neal (12)
| Walker, Wade (4)
| American Airlines Arena20,245
| 2–1
|- align="center" bgcolor="#ccffcc"
| 4
| May 29
| Detroit
| W 89–78
| Dwyane Wade (31)
| Shaquille O'Neal (9)
| Dwyane Wade (5)
| American Airlines Arena20,248
| 3–1
|- align="center" bgcolor="#ffcccc"
| 5
| May 31
| @ Detroit
| L 78–91
| Dwyane Wade (23)
| Udonis Haslem (10)
| Jason Williams (6)
| The Palace of Auburn Hills22,076
| 3–2
|- align="center" bgcolor="#ccffcc"
| 6
| June 2
| Detroit
| W 95–78
| Shaquille O'Neal (28)
| Shaquille O'Neal (16)
| Dwyane Wade (10)
| American Airlines Arena20,258
| 4–2
|-

|- align="center" bgcolor="#ffcccc"
| 1
| June 8
| @ Dallas
| L 80–90
| Dwyane Wade (28)
| Udonis Haslem (9)
| Dwyane Wade (6)
| American Airlines Center20,475
| 0–1
|- align="center" bgcolor="#ffcccc"
| 2
| June 11
| @ Dallas
| L 85–99
| Dwyane Wade (23)
| Dwyane Wade (8)
| Payton, Williams (4)
| American Airlines Center20,459
| 0–2
|- align="center" bgcolor="#ccffcc"
| 3
| June 13
| Dallas
| W 98–96
| Dwyane Wade (42)
| Dwyane Wade (13)
| Shaquille O'Neal (5)
| American Airlines Arena20,145
| 1–2
|- align="center" bgcolor="#ccffcc"
| 4
| June 15
| Dallas
| W 98–74
| Dwyane Wade (36)
| Shaquille O'Neal (13)
| Jason Williams (6)
| American Airlines Arena20,145
| 2–2
|- align="center" bgcolor="#ccffcc"
| 5
| June 18
| Dallas
| W 101–100 (OT)
| Dwyane Wade (43)
| Shaquille O'Neal (12)
| Wade, Williams (4)
| American Airlines Arena20,145
| 3–2
|- align="center" bgcolor="#ccffcc"
| 6
| June 20
| @ Dallas
| W 95–92
| Dwyane Wade (36)
| Shaquille O'Neal (12)
| Jason Williams (7)
| American Airlines Center20,522
| 4–2

2006 NBA Finals

Game One
Dallas' Jason Terry scored a playoff-high 32 points as the Mavericks overcame a 31–23 deficit at the end of the first quarter.

Game Two
Dirk Nowitzki had a stellar 26-point-16 rebound performance, and the Mavericks cruised past the Heat to take a 2–0 series lead.

Game Three
Led by Dwyane Wade's 42 points and 13 rebounds, the Heat rallied from a 13-point deficit with six minutes to go in the fourth quarter.  The momentum-changing comeback was capped by a Gary Payton field goal from just inside the three-point line with 9.3 seconds left.

Game Four
Dwyane Wade shined again for the Heat with 36 points, and Miami held Dallas to just seven points in the fourth quarter en route to a series-tying, blowout victory. The Mavericks' low-scoring fourth quarter was the lowest ever by any team during the NBA Finals. Jerry Stackhouse caught Shaquille O'Neal with a flagrant foul that resulted in his suspension for Game 5.

Game Five
Making a strong case for NBA Finals MVP, Wade was the star yet again with 43 points shooting as many free throws as all the Mavericks combined, leading the Heat to their third straight win over Dallas after being down 0–2 in the series. After a controversial play in which Mavericks owner Mark Cuban thought Wade committed a backcourt violation, Wade hit the game-winning free throws with 1.9 seconds left, and also made the shot that sent the game into overtime. He set an NBA Finals record for most made free-throws in a game with 21. The NBA, upon further review of the play, deemed that the officials made the correct call, and that there was no backcourt violation committed.

After the game, Dirk Nowitzki kicked a ball into the stands and Mavericks owner Mark Cuban caused many "acts of misconduct" resulting in both of them being fined $5,000 and $250,000 respectively.

Game Six
Behind Dwyane Wade's 36 points, Miami edged Dallas to win their first championship in franchise history. Averaging 34.7 points per game in the championship series, Wade was named NBA Finals MVP (Most Valuable Player).

Award winners

 Shaquille O'Neal, NBA leader in field goal percentage
 He joined Wilt Chamberlain as the only two players in league history to lead the league in field goal percentage nine times.
 Shaquille O'Neal, All-NBA First Team
 Dwyane Wade, NBA All-Star Skills Challenge Champion
 Dwyane Wade, All-NBA Second Team
 Dwyane Wade, NBA Finals MVP
 Dwyane Wade, Sports Illustrated Sportsman of the Year
NBA All-Star Game
 Dwyane Wade, NBA All-Star Game Appearance
 Shaquille O'Neal, NBA All-Star Appearance

References

 Heat on Database Basketball
 Heat on Basketball Reference

Miami Heat seasons
Miami
Eastern Conference (NBA) championship seasons
NBA championship seasons
Miami Heat
Miami Heat